The Asano River (romaji: Asano Gawa) is a river in Kanazawa, Ishikawa Prefecture, Japan.

History
In 1953, a flood on the river destroyed all of the bridges over the river except Asanogawa-ohashi Bridge. Due to the continuous flood on the river over the years, a watercourse was constructed in 1974 to mitigate the flood. Nevertheless, another flood occurred in 2008.

Bridges
Bridges that cross the river from upstream to downstream are Shimotagamibashi Bridge, Asahibashi Bridge, Wakamatsubashi Bridge, Kenrokuayumibashi Bridge, Suzumibashi Bridge, Tokiwabashi Bridge, Tenjinbashi Bridge, Umenohashi Bridge, Asanogawa-ohashi Bridge, Nakanohashi Bridge, Kobashi Bridge, Hikoso-ohashi Bridge, Shoeibashi Bridge and Nakajima-ohashi Bridge.

Facilities
The river is equipped with walking path along it from Tokiwabashi Bridge to Nakajima-ohashi Bridge.

Transportation
The river is accessible from Kagatsume Station, Kitama Station, Okobata Station, Mitsuya Station, Mitsukuchi Station, Waridashi Station, Isobe Station, Kami-Moroe Station and Nanatsuya Station of Hokuriku Railroad.

References

Kanazawa
Rivers of Ishikawa Prefecture
Rivers of Japan